Per Thorkildsen is a Norwegian former professional racing cyclist. He won the Norwegian National Road Race Championship in 1948.

References

External links

Year of birth missing (living people)
Living people
Norwegian male cyclists
Place of birth missing (living people)